is a cancelled role-playing video game by Gust Co. Ltd. The title was announced in 2013 as a PlayStation Vita exclusive title, but was quietly cancelled in April 2016. The game was intended to be a new IP by Gust, that would have mixed many of the elements of their Atelier and Ar Nosurge series of games with elements of time travel.

Gameplay
The game was to play as a role-playing video game with elements of time travel. In the game, the player could choose to go back in time and chose different options to alter the way events would unfold, similar to the gameflow of Radiant Historia. For example, a forest fire was to occur over the course of the game, and the player would be given the opportunity to travel back in time and chose different options to prevent said forest fire from happening. Typical of JRPGs, the game would involve battling monsters to gain experience points to make the player's characters stronger. When the player would choose to move the players backwards through time, the characters would retain the attributes that made the character stronger, which was to be used strategically to the player's advantage. For example, if an enemy was too difficult to defeat at a point of the game, the player could skip it, advance farther into the game while getting stronger, then choose to go back in time and fight it in their stronger form, allowing for an easier fight.

Story
The game's premise involved a group of young adventures being dropped into a mysterious world where no sign of civilization was present. The course of the story's game would involve the characters trying to figure out how to survive on their own in the foreign world, and find out how and why they appeared there in the first place, as no one has any recollection of how they found themselves there. The cast's ultimate goal is to return home. Five main characters of the party had been revealed: Iris, Time, Primla, Scion, and Licorice. Additionally, eight other "artificial intelligence" characters, referred to as homunculi, can be created to assist the main characters in the game's tasks as well.  The classes were "Witch", "Swordsman", "Summoner", "Star Hymnist", "Saint", "Battle Maiden", "Shrine Maiden", and "Sacred Tree", although their exact roles for how they assisted the player were not explicitly defined.

Development
The game was first announced in a June 2013 issue of Dengeki PlayStation, with an initial release date of September 23, 2013. The development team, Gust's, main goal in creating the game was to make it an RPG that was easy for the player to get into, and easy to play repeatedly. Character designs were drawn by a vocaloid artist that goes by "Non". While the game was meant to be brand new IP for Gust, it still shared concepts frequently visited in its other games, such as item synthesizing and artificial life seen in their Atelier and Ar Nosurge titles.

In mid-2013, screenshots and information regarding the game were released, but the game was delayed shortly prior to its release date and without a new release date. No further updates on the game were given after the delay, in 2014 or 2015, although the game had not been announced as cancelled at the time, with its official website even remaining active through 2016. The game was announced as cancelled in April 2016 in an issue of Famitsu. No reason was given for its cancellation. Tecmo Koei had not announced plans on whether or not they would have localized the game for English language regions. IGN speculated that it could go either way; smaller publishers such as NIS America had found success in translating some rather niche titles for the Vita, such as Danganronpa, but on the other hand, Tecmo Koei had opted out of translating the Vita version of One Piece: Pirate Warriors 2 around the time of Chronos Materia announcement.

Notes

References

Cancelled PlayStation Vita games
Atelier (video game series)